Mirko Tobias Schäfer is a media scholar at Utrecht University. He is an Associate Professor at the Department for Information & Computer Sciences and Science Lead of the Utrecht Data School.

Biography
Schäfer studied theater, media and communication studies at the University of Vienna and digital culture at Utrecht University. He obtained a Ph.D. in 2008 at Utrecht University. Schäfer's research revolves around technology and how they transform society. He publishes on digital culture, cultural theory and new media. In 2011 he was awarded a fellowship at the University of Applied Arts Vienna. He has been a research fellow at the University of Applied Arts Vienna, postdoctoral fellow at the Centre for Humanities at Utrecht University and a Mercator Research Fellow at the NRW School of Governance. In 2022 he was appointed visiting professor at the University of Helsinki.

Research activity
Schäfer conducted research on hacker communities, user participation and their impact on cultural industries.

In stark contrast to the general field of new media studies his research on participatory culture provides a critical deconstruction of user participation. Coining the term of an extended culture industry he builds upon the cultural critique of the Frankfurt School, most notably Adorno and Horkheimer. Developing the concept of an extended culture industry, Schäfer could show to what extent appropriation of design by users is embedded into corporate production. Through distinguishing user participation into explicit participation and implicit participation, Schäfer delivers a terminology to separate conscious and active user engagement from user activities that are channeled by user interface design.

Schäfer's contribution to the field of participatory culture was his distinction of implicit and explicit participation. Explicit participation refers to the conscious activities of cultural production and social interaction as it has been covered by Henry Jenkins in his work on fan culture. Implicit participation refers to the subtle ways of channeling user activities through interface design. Schäfer considers strategies of implicit participation as key aspect in popular social media application He argues that media practices that had been developed in using the world wide web, now are implemented in easy to use interfaces and new business models. Schäfer's analysis of participatory culture depicts an accurate "shift within the commercial media industries to embrace certain conceptions of the fan as an idealized consumer of transmedia entertainment."
In his analysis, Schäfer focused on the role of user interface design, platform governance and methods of controlling and channeling user activities. 

Since 2015 his research is situated in the emerging field of critical data studies and revolves around investigating the impact of datafication and AI on citizenship and democracy.

Utrecht Data School
Together with Thomas Boeschoten, at the time MA student, Schäfer founded the Utrecht Data School in 2013. It is a platform for teaching data analysis and digital methods. Initially a lack of funding pushed the founders to reach out to external partners, e.g. corporations, government organisations and NGO's, to finance the courses through commissioned research projects. That allowed them and their students to work on actual projects and experience how datafication manifests and transforms organisations. Consequently, the Utrecht Data School developed services and products that would enable researchers to enter societal fields as "experts and not as mere researchers." Schäfer dubbed this approach entrepreneurial research. At the core of the teaching programme is the Practicum of the Utrecht Data School in which students learn basic data analysis and digital methods. They practice their skills through working on an applied research project in cooperation with an external partner of the school. The Data Ethics Decision Aid (DEDA) is an ethical impact assessment for data projects. While organizations using DEDA can review and improve their data practices considering values and responsibilities, the researchers who function as workshop moderators can gather empirical data about the participants' awareness for data ethics, the organization's operational capacities and their data practices.

Publications

Schäfer, M.T.; Van Es, K. (2017) The Datafied Society. Studying Culture through Data. Amsterdam: Amsterdam University Press

Schäfer, M.T. (2011) Bastard Culture! How User Participation Transforms Cultural Production. Amsterdam: Amsterdam University Press.

Schäfer, M.T.; Van den Boomen, M; Lehmann, AS; Lammes, S.; Raessens, J. (2009) Digital Material. Tracing New Media in Everyday Life and Technology. Amsterdam: Amsterdam University Press.

See also
Critical theory
New media
Participatory culture
Critical data studies

References

External links
Official website
Utrecht Data School

Living people
Mass media scholars
Mass media theorists
Digital media
Place of birth missing (living people)
University of Vienna alumni
Academic staff of Utrecht University
Year of birth missing (living people)